The Thames and Medway Coast Artillery, which at its peak comprised three full regiments, was formed in Britain's Territorial Army in 1932 to man coastal defence guns on both banks of the Thames Estuary. It served in this role during World War II, at the end of which it sent troops to work in the rear areas in Europe. It was reformed postwar but was broken up when the coast artillery branch was abolished in 1956.

Origin
When Britain's Territorial Force (TF) was reconstituted on 7 February 1920 after World War I, the former Essex and Suffolk Royal Garrison Artillery, which had defended the ports around Harwich, was split into separate sections. The Essex Royal Garrison Artillery was redesignated the Essex Coast Brigade, Royal Garrison Artillery the following year when the TF was reorganised as the Territorial Army (TA). It consisted of a headquarters at Dovercourt and a single battery numbered 175. When the Royal Garrison Artillery was subsumed into the Royal Artillery (RA) in 1924, the unit was redesignated again as the Essex Heavy Brigade, RA.

Thames & Medway Heavy Brigade
In 1926 it was decided that the coastal defence guns of Great Britain should be solely manned by part-time soldiers of the TA. This involved some reorganisation of existing units and the creation of some new units. By 1932 the reorganisation had taken its final form: the defences of the ports of Eastern England would be responsibility of three RA heavy brigades. The Suffolk Hvy Bde would man the Harwich batteries, the Kent and Sussex Hvy Bdes would combine as the Kent and Sussex to man the batteries from Dover to Newhaven, and a newly-formed Thames and Medway Heavy Brigade would be responsible for the Thames Estuary including the Medway defences. The new unit was formed on 1 October 1932, comprising two batteries transferred from the Kent Hvy Bde and absorbing the single-battery Essex Hvy Bde, giving the following organisation:

 Headquarters (HQ) at Fort Clarence, Rochester
 167 (Kent) Heavy Battery at Pelham Road, Gravesend
 169 (Kent) Heavy Battery at the Royal Artillery Barracks, Sheerness
 175 (Essex) Heavy Battery at Dovercourt, moving to the Drill Hall, York Road, Southend-on-Sea

In line with the RA's modernisation of its titles, the brigade was termed a regiment from 1 November 1938. As the TA was increased in size after the Munich Crisis, the Thames & Medway (T&M) Hvy Rgt formed a new 192 Hvy Bty at Southend by August 1939.

World War II

Mobilisation
On the outbreak of war on 3 September 1939 the regiment was responsible for the following guns:
 5 x 9.2-inch
 6 x 6-inch
 2 x 4.7-inch
 4 x 12-pounders

These were controlled by:
 Thames Fire Command at Shoeburyness
 Medway Fire Command at Sheerness
under the command of RA Fixed Defences, Eastern Ports, with its HQ at Sheerness

Home Defence
With the danger of invasion after the British Expeditionary Force was evacuated from Dunkirk, the coastal artillery regiments underwent a major reorganisation in the summer of 1940. On 14 July the three T&M heavy batteries were expanded into three complete coast regiments:

516th (Thames & Medway) Coast Regiment
Formed with A, B, C and D Btys, later organised as:
 357 Bty – joined 31 December 1940, at Shornemead Fort; transferred to 518th (T&M) Coast Rgt by 1 April 1940
 284 Bty – formed from part of A Bty 1 April 1941, at Grain Fort
 285 Bty – formed from part of A Bty 1 April 1941, at Martello battery
 286 Bty – formed from B Bty 1 April 1941, at Whitehall Farm, moved to Canvey Island by 16 March 1943
 287 Bty – formed from C Bty 1 April 1941, at Garrison Point, moved to Grain Fort by 16 April 1943
 288 Bty – formed from D Bty 1 April 1941, as Garrison anti-Motor Torpedo Boat battery
 220 Bty – formed 16 January 1941 by 72 Coast Training Rgt at Norton Camp, joined 30 April 1941 at Sheerness

517th (Thames & Medway) Coast Regiment
Formed with A and B Btys, later organised as:
 B Bty – disbanded 31 December 1940
 332 Bty – joined 31 December 1940, at Foulness, moved to Bawdsey 10 February 1942
 356 Bty – joined 31 December 1940, at Coalhouse Fort
 419 Bty – formed 21 September 1940, joined 31 December 1940, at Shoeburyness
 167 Bty – formed from part of A Bty 1 April 1941, 6-inch battery at Canvey Island, moved to Garrison Point 16 March 1943
 168 Bty – formed from part of A Bty 1 April 1941, 3-pounder battery at Canvey Island, moved to Scars Elbow and St Mary's Bay by November 1941

518th (Thames & Medway) Coast Regiment
Formed with A and B Btys, later organised as:
 334 Bty – joined 31 December 1940, at Shellness, moved to No 1 Bastion 7 December 1942
 289 Bty – formed from A Bty 1 April 1941
 290 Bty – formed from B Bty 1 April 1941; transferred to 540th Coast Rgt 16 April 1941
 357 Bty – joined from 516th (T&M) Rgt 15 September 1941; transferred to 524th (Lancashire & Cheshire) Coast Rgt 23 October 1941
 109 Bty – joined from 524th (L&C) Rgt 23 October 1941, at Shornemead Fort

During the summer of 1940 a number of emergency batteries of ex-Royal Navy guns were installed, including:

 Shoeburyness – 2 x 6-inch
 Coalhouse Fort – 2 x 5.5-inch
 Shornemead Fort – 2 x 5.5-inch
 Shellness – 2 x 6-inch

By November 1940 the Thames & Medway guns comprised: 
 5 x 9.2-inch
 10 x 6-inch
 4 x 5.5-inch
 3 x 6-pounders
 2 x 3-pounders

Mid-War
By September 1941, when Britain's coast defences were at their height, the Thames & Medway fixed guns were:
 2 x 9.2-inch
 12 x 6-inch
 4 x 5.5-inch
 5 x 6-pounder

After the rapid expansion in the early part of the war, there was some rationalisation among coast artillery units, with 518th (T&M) Coast Rgt being disbanded on 1 October 1941 and its batteries distributed amongst the other two regiments, which then had the following organisation under the command of HQ Thames and Medway Defences:

516th (Thames & Medway) Coast Regiment
 Regimental HQ (RHQ) at Sheerness in Sheerness FC
 220, 287, 288 Btys
 284 Bty – disbanded 1 December 1941 and personnel distributed to the other batteries
 285 Bty – disbanded 15 March 1943
 286 Bty – transferred to 517th (T&M) Rgt 16 March 1943
 289 Bty – joined from 518th (T&M) Rgt 15 September 1941; transferred to 520th (Kent & Sussex) Coast Rgt 16 April 1943
 334 Bty – joined from 518th (T&M) Rgt 15 September 1941
 167 Bty – joined from 517th (T&M) Rgt 16 March 1943
 295 Bty – joined from 520th (K&S) Rgt 16 April 1943
 No 3 Coast Observer Detachment (COD) – joined from 568th (Devon) Coast Rgt by July 1943; temporarily transferred to 521st (K&S) Coast Rgt November 1943–March 1944

517th (Thames & Medway) Coast Regiment
 RHQ at Canvey in Thames FC
 168, 356, 419 Btys
 109 Bty – transferred to War Office (WO) control 12 February 1942 and attached to Coast Artillery Training Centre
 332 Bty – transferred to 515th (Suffolk) Coast Rgt 10 February 1942
 425 Independent Coast Bty – joined 12 February 1942, at Shornemead
 167 Bty – transferred to 516th (T&M) Rgt 16 March 1943
 286 Bty – joined from 516th (T&M) Rgt 16 March 1943 

By July 1942 Coastal Artillery Plotting Rooms had been created to coordinate the 'coast watching' radar of the CODs, with No 13 plotting room assigned to Sheerness.

By the end of 1942 the threat from German attack had diminished and there was demand for trained gunners for the fighting fronts. A process of reducing the manpower in the coast defences began in 1943, but there were few organisational changes for the Thames & Medway defences closest to the enemy.

The manpower requirements for the forthcoming Allied invasion of Normandy (Operation Overlord) led to further reductions in coast defences in April 1944. By this stage of the war many of the coast battery positions were manned by Home Guard detachments or in the hands of care and maintenance parties. On 1 April 168 and 286 Btys were transferred from 517th to 516th Coast Rgt, and 220 Bty was transferred in the opposite direction, while No 3 COD was disbanded.

Late war
By the end of 1944 serious naval attacks on the coast could be discounted and the WO began  reorganising surplus coastal units into garrison infantry battalions. On 3 December RHQ of 516th Coast Rgt was converted into 516th (Thames & Medway) Garrison Rgt, RA, and its batteries (167, 168, 286, 287, 288, 334, 356, 425) became independent and then transferred to 517th (T&M) Coast Rgt. By January 1945 21st Army Group operating in North West Europe was suffering a manpower crisis, so the WO went further and converted the RA garrison regiments (and some other RA units) into infantry battalions for duties in the rear areas. 516th (T&M) Garrison Rgt was converted into 614th (Thames & Medway) Infantry Rgt, RA, comprising five batteries designated A–E. It served in Europe until after the end of the war, passing into suspended animation between 5 and 25 July 1946. On 1 June 1945, shortly after VE Day, RHQ of 517th Coast Rgt had gone into suspended animation together with its  TA batteries, while the war-formed batteries were disbanded.

Postwar
When the TA was reconstituted on 1 January 1947, 614 (T&M) Rgt was reformed as 415 (Thames & Medway) Coast Rgt with RHQ at Gravesend and R (Essex) Bty at Artillery House, Stratford Green. It formed part of 101 Coast Bde at Dover.

The Coast Artillery Branch of the RA was disbanded during 1956, and on 31 October the regiment was broken up. Its Kent batteries amalgamated with 263 (6th London) Medium Rgt to form 263 (6th London) Light Rgt, while the Essex batteries amalgamated with 353 (London) Medium Rgt. In 1961 the Essex (Canvey Island and Southend) batteries of 353 Med Rgt were absorbed into 304 (Essex Yeomanry Royal Horse Artillery) Field Rgt, while the Kent (Sheerness and Gravesend) batteries of 263 Med Rgt were amalgamated with a battery of 458 (Kent) Light Anti-Aircraft Rgt and 211 Field Squadron, Royal Engineers to become 211 (Thames & Medway) Field Sqn in 44th (Home Counties) Divisional/District Engineers.

Honorary Colonels
The following served as Honorary Colonel of the unit:
 Lt-Col F.W. Leaver, TD, appointed 18 June 1930
 Col Fiennes, 1st Lord Cornwallis, CBE, TD, appointed 11 March 1933, died 26 September 1935
 Capt Wykeham, 2nd Lord Cornwallis, MC, appointed 25 September 1937

Insignia
415 Coast Rgt is believed to have worn an unofficial  supplementary shoulder title with 'THAMES & MEDWAY' embroidered in the RA colours of red on navy blue.

Notes

References

 
 Maj L.F. Ellis, History of the Second World War, United Kingdom Military Series: Victory in the West, Vol II: The Defeat of Germany, London: HM Stationery Office, 1968/Uckfield: Naval & Military, 2004, ISBN 1-845740-59-9.
 Gen Sir Martin Farndale, History of the Royal Regiment of Artillery: The Years of Defeat: Europe and North Africa, 1939–1941, Woolwich: Royal Artillery Institution, 1988/London: Brasseys, 1996, ISBN 1-85753-080-2.
 J.B.M. Frederick, Lineage Book of British Land Forces 1660–1978, Vol II, Wakefield: Microform Academic, 1984, ISBN 1-85117-009-X.
 Norman E.H. Litchfield, The Territorial Artillery 1908–1988 (Their Lineage, Uniforms and Badges), Nottingham: Sherwood Press, 1992, ISBN 0-9508205-2-0.
 Col K. W. Maurice-Jones, The History of Coast Artillery in the British Army, London: Royal Artillery Institution, 1959/Uckfield: Naval & Military Press, 2005, ISBN 978-1-845740-31-3.
 Graham E. Watson & Richard A. Rinaldi, The Corps of Royal Engineers: Organization and Units 1889–2018, Tiger Lily Books, 2018, ISBN 978-171790180-4.

External sources
 British Army units from 1945 on
 Orders of Battle at Patriot Files
 Royal Artillery 1939–45.
 Stepping Forward: A Tribute to the Volunteer Military Reservists and Supporting Auxiliaries of Greater London 
 Graham Watson, The Territorial Army 1947

Military units and formations in Essex
Military units and formations in Kent
Military units and formations established in 1932